Evel Pie is a pizzeria in Las Vegas, Nevada in the United States. The restaurant is named after Evel Knievel and features memorabilia related to the entertainer. The motto of the restaurant is "Live hard, ride fast, eat pizza." Evel Pie made international news after introducing a chapulines (grasshopper) pizza.

History

Evel Pie opened in 2016 on Fremont Street in Downtown Las Vegas. It took over the site of the former Radio City Pizza and F. Pigalle restaurants. In 2019, Evel Pie was named "Best Pizzeria" by Las Vegas Weekly and VegNews named the restaurant one of the best places for vegan pizza in the United States.

Design

The restaurant and bar is a tribute to Evel Knievel. It is based on a pizzeria built in 1979 and features Evel Knievel memorabilia, the majority of which is from the collection of the Knievel family.  Memorabilia includes a pinball machine, skateboards, bicycles, photographs, and a bust of Knievel.

Cuisine and beverages
Evel Pie serves New York-style pizza. The menu includes classic cheese and pepperoni pizzas, and speciality pies, including "Balls to the Wall" made with meatballs and gravy, a pizza with rattlesnake jalapeńo sausage, and Hog Heaven, a pizza with barbecue sauce, smoked mozzarella, fontina, pulled pork, bacon, and red onions. There is also a white pizza, without tomato sauce, named after Barry White. The restaurant also offers housemade meatballs topped with tomato sauce. In 2019, Evel Pie introduced a chapulines (grasshopper) pizza named "The Canyon Hopper." The pizza was created after countless grasshoppers swarmed Las Vegas, triggering the weather radar to report it as a storm.

The restaurant has a full bar and serves inexpensive beer, including Schiltz and Hamm's.

References

External links

Evel Pie from Atlas Obscura

2016 establishments in Nevada
Pizzerias in the United States
Restaurants in Las Vegas, Nevada
Restaurants established in 2016